Partial legislative elections were held in Belgium on Tuesday 9 June 1835. In the Senate elections Catholics won 31 seats and Liberals eight. Only 23,000 people were eligible to vote in the election.

Under the alternating system, Chamber elections were only held in four out of the nine provinces: East Flanders, Hainaut, Liège and Limburg. Thus, 51 of the 102 Chamber seats were up for election.

The incumbent government was led by Barthélémy de Theux de Meylandt.

Results

Senate

References

1830s elections in Belgium
General
Belgium
Belgium